Christopher Howard Mzwakhe Sibisi (born 27 July 1970) is a South African educator and politician serving as a Member of the National Assembly of South Africa since May 2019. Sibisi is a member of the National Freedom Party. He served as the party's acting secretary-general in 2019.

Education
Sibisi holds a matric certificate as well as a teacher's diploma.

Politics
Sibisi is a member of the National Freedom Party. He was appointed as the acting secretary general of the party after incumbent Nhlanhlakayise Khubisa had resigned. He held this position until December 2019, when Canaan Mdletshe was elected to the position.

Parliamentary career
Sibisi was nominated  to the National Assembly of South Africa after the general election held on 8 May 2019. He was sworn in as an MP on 22 May 2019.

Committees
On 27 June 2019, he was named to his committees. They are:
Portfolio Committee on Basic Education (Alternate Member)
Portfolio Committee on Cooperative Governance and Traditional Affairs (Alternate Member)
Portfolio Committee on Employment and Labour (Alternate Member)
Portfolio Committee on Public Service and Administration (Member)
Portfolio Committee on Sports, Arts and Culture (Member)
Portfolio Committee on Transport (Alternate Member)

References

Living people
1970 births
People from KwaZulu-Natal
Zulu people
21st-century South African politicians
Members of the National Assembly of South Africa
National Freedom Party politicians